The Clark Memorial Church is an active place of worship for the Church of Scotland in Largs, North Ayrshire, Scotland. It was designed by William Kerr in 1890–1892, and is a category A listed building, having been listed in 1971.

References 

Church of Scotland churches in Scotland
Category A listed buildings in North Ayrshire
Listed churches in North Ayrshire